Meditations in an Emergency is a book of poetry by American poet Frank O'Hara, first published by Grove Press in 1957.  Its title poem was first printed in the November 1954 issue of Poetry: A Magazine of Verse.

The name of the book is purported to derive from English poet John Donne's prose work, Devotions upon Emergent Occasions, stemming from a joke between O'Hara and other members of the renowned New York School of poets.  Critics have noted the influence of impressionism and abstract expressionism in the collection, with most of the poems detailing the theme of identity and everyday life in New York City.

The book is dedicated to painter Jane Freilicher.

Poems
 To the Harbormaster
 Poem: "The eager note on my door..."
 To the Film industry in Crisis
 Poem: "At night Chinamen jump"
 Blocks
 Les Etiquette jaunes
 Aus einem April
 River
 Poem: "There I could never be a boy"
 On Rachmaninoff's Birthday
 The Hunter
 For Grace, After a Party
 On Looking at "La Grande Jatte," the Czar Wept Anew
 Romanze, or The Music Students
 The Three-Penny Opera
 A Terrestrial Cuckoo
 Jane Awake
 A Mexican Guitar
 Chez Jane
 Two Variations
 Ode
 Invincibility
 Poem in January
 Meditations in an Emergency
 For James Dean
 Sleeping on the Wing
 Radio
 On Seeing Larry Rivers' "Washington Crossing the Delaware" at the Museum of Modern Art
 For Janice and Kenneth to Voyage
 Mayakovsky

Mentions in popular culture
The book, and references to it, are seen on several occasions in Season 2 of the AMC television drama Mad Men:

 In season 2, episode 1, "For Those Who Think Young", the book is read by an unknown character in a bar and later by the protagonist, Don Draper. At the end of the episode, a passage from the fourth section of the poem "Mayakovsky" (alluding to Vladimir Mayakovsky, a prominent poet and playwright of the Russian Futurist movement) is recited.
 In episode 12, "The Mountain King", Draper, visiting California on business, visits Anna Draper and finds the book he sent on her bookshelf.
 Episode 13, set against the backdrop of the Cuban Missile Crisis, is titled "Meditations in an Emergency".
Additionally, in Sally Rooney's book Normal People and its 2020 BBC Three-Hulu TV adaptation, Connell gives this poetry collection to Marianne on her birthday.

References

1957 poetry books
American poetry collections
New York School poets
Grove Press books